Ananta Kumar Ghosh (born 4 November 1954) is an Indian football coach who last managed Mohammedan Sporting.

Coaching career
Born in Kolkata, West Bengal, Ghosh started his coaching career in football in the 1980s when he gained his Master of Sports from the National Institute of Sports in Patiala. He then earned his AFC "B" License in 1998 before earning his AFC "A" License in 2000. In 2005, while heading the Sports Authority of India coaching association, Ghosh blamed the lack of coordination between the government and sports bodies for why football in India is lacking behind the rest of the world.

In 2012, after sacking head coach Pakir Ali, Chirag United Club Kerala announced that Ghosh would join the team later in the season as a coach but for some reason that move never materialized.

United
On 15 February 2014, it was announced that Ghosh had signed with United S.C. of the I-League for the remainder of the season as the head coach following the resignation of Eelco Schattorie.

Mohammedan
After his stint with United, Ghosh signed on as the head coach of Mohammedan for their I-League 2nd Division campaign.

Statistics
.

References

1954 births
Living people
Footballers from Kolkata
Indian football managers
I-League managers
Association footballers not categorized by position
Mohammedan SC (Kolkata) managers
Association football players not categorized by nationality